Nariño is a department of Colombia named after independence leader Antonio Nariño. Its capital is Pasto. It is in the west of the country, bordering Ecuador and the Pacific Ocean.  

Nariño has a diverse geography and varied climate according to altitude: hot in the plains of the Pacific and cold in the mountains, where most of the population resides, a situation that is repeated in a north-south direction. Other important cities include Tumaco and Ipiales.

History

The territory was occupied during the Pre-Columbian era by numerous Indian tribes, including Quillacingas, Awá, Pasto, and Tumas. The first European  conquistador who entered the territory was Andagoya Pascual in 1522, who traveled from the Colombian Pacific coast and then used information obtained by Francisco Pizarro to organize the expedition that culminated in the conquest of Peru.

Juan de Ampudia and Pedro de Añazco first explored the mountainous part of the department, commissioned by Sebastián de Belalcázar in 1535, who then toured the territory in 1536 and reached Popayán and remained for some time before leaving for Spain.

Municipalities

 Albán
 Aldana
 Ancuya
 Arboleda
 Barbacoas
 Belén
 Buesaco
 Chachagüí
 Colón (Génova)
 Consaca
 Contadero
 Córdoba
 Cuaspud
 Cumbal
 Cumbitara
 El Charco
 El Peñol
 El Rosario
 El Tablón
 El Tambo
 Francisco Pizarro
 Funes
 Guachucal
 Guaitarilla
 Gualmatán
 Iles
 Imués
 Ipiales
 La Cruz
 La Florida
 La Llanada
 La Tola
 La Unión
 Leiva
 Linares
 Los Andes
 Magüí Payán
 Mallama
 Mosquera
 Nariño
 Olaya Herrera
 Ospina
 Pasto
 Policarpa
 Potosí
 Providencia
 Puerres
 Pupiales
 Ricaurte
 Roberto Payán
 Samaniego
 San Bernardo
 Sandona
 San Lorenzo
 San Pablo
 San Pedro de Cartago
 Santa Bárbara
 Santacruz
 Sapuyes
 Taminango
 Tangua
 Tumaco
 Túquerres
 Yacuanquer

See also
 Las Lajas Sanctuary

References

External links
 Government of Narino official website

Territorial-Environmental Information System of Colombian Amazon SIAT-AC website

 
Departments of Colombia
States and territories established in 1904